Flying Tiger is a supervillain appearing in American comic books published by Marvel Comics.

Publication history
Flying Tiger first appeared in Spider-Woman #40 (Oct. 1981), and was created by Chris Claremont, Steve Leialoha, and Bob Wiacek.

The character subsequently appears in Spider-Woman #50 (June 1983), Iron Man #177 (Dec. 1983), Fantastic Four #335 (Dec. 1989), Avengers Spotlight #29 (Feb. 1990), Captain America #411 (Jan. 1993), #413 (March 1993), Thunderbolts #3 (June 1997), #18-20 (Sept.–Nov. 1998), #22 (Jan. 1999), #24-25 (March–April 1999), and Avengers: The Initiative Annual #1 (Jan. 2008).

Flying Tiger received an entry in the All-New Official Handbook of the Marvel Universe A to Z: Update #2 (2007).

Fictional character biography
Flying Tiger's true identity is unknown. A professional football player whose career was cut short, he develops a costume that enabled him to fly. He starts his criminal career as a mercenary assassin when he's hired to kill the original Spider-Woman.

Flying Tiger is among the superhuman individuals abducted by Locksmith and Tick-Tock where they're placed in Locksmith's prison. When in his cell, Flying Tiger feels claustrophobic. He is later freed by Spider-Woman and Gypsy Moth.

General Nguyen Ngoc Coy later recommends Flying Tiger to his South American rebel allies. He is later hired to abduct businessmen Regis Fussky and deposit him at a base in South America. As part of an agreement with Kingpin, Flying Tiger is not to abduct Regis Fussky until he's out of the United States. Regis Fussky hires Iron Man (James Rhodes) to be his bodyguard while Flying Tiger replaces the co-pilot of Regis Fussky's airplane. Once the airplane is over South America, Flying Tiger emerges from the cockpit and grabbed Regis Fussky while grabbing the suitcase that contained the Iron Man armor. During Flying Tiger's fight with Iron Man, the US government begins dropping bombs on Colonel Perez's camp. Flying Tiger was caught in one of the explosions. Iron Man rescues Regis Fussky and takes down the fleeing Flying Tiger.

During the "Acts of Vengeance", Doctor Doom used an Aggression Enhancer on Flying Tiger and other villains to attack the Fantastic Four when they stood before Congress. They were defeated by the Fantastic Four.

Flying Tiger was next seen being admitted into the Vault following a massive prison escape attempt.

Later, Flying Tiger joined the Crimson Cowl's Masters of Evil. The group's plot to blackmail the governments of the world using a weather-controlling machine was stopped by the Thunderbolts.

Later in San Francisco, Flying Tiger was defeated by Armory.

During the "Fear Itself" storyline, Flying Tiger was seen trying to escape from the demolished Raft until he ran into the Avengers Academy staff.

Flying Tiger and Puff Adder were watching TV when a bandaged Peter Parker rolled in on a wheelchair and joined them. Parker realized that he was among the supervillains when Shocker appeared with an updated mask that Tinkerer created for him. The Black Lodge's Surgeon General asked Flying Tiger to help take down Spider-Man. Flying Tiger joined Puff Adder and Eel II in fighting the still-bandaged Spider-Man. During the fight, Flying Tiger tossed Spider-Man against a wall only to be later knocked out by Spider-Man. Upon Firebrand setting the building on fire, Spider-Man got Flying Tiger and Eel's bodies out of the building.

During the Avengers: Standoff! storyline, Flying Tiger was an inmate of Pleasant Hill, a gated community established by S.H.I.E.L.D.

Flying Tiger later appears as a member of Baron Helmut Zemo's "New Masters" alongside fellow villains Firebrand and Plantman II. They later encounter Steve Rogers, the original Captain America, Free Spirit and Jack Flag. During the fight, Flying Tiger is defeated by Jack Flag.

During the "Hunted" storyline, Flying Tiger is among the animal-themed characters captured by Taskmaster and Black Ant for Kraven the Hunter's Great Hunt that is sponsored by Arcade's company Arcade Industries. He was shown being grabbed by one of the Hunter-Bots created by Arcade Industries while trying to flee.

Equipment
Flying Tiger wears body armor under a tiger costume and is capable of powered flight. He also has enhanced strength, durability and endurance, and a set of claws.

References

External links
 
 Flying Tiger at Marvel Wiki
 

Comics characters introduced in 1981
Characters created by Chris Claremont
Fictional players of American football
Fictional mercenaries in comics
Marvel Comics supervillains